Marlon Williams (born September 9, 1956) is a long-distance runner who represents the United States Virgin Islands. He competed in the marathon at the 1984, 1988 and the 1996 Summer Olympics.

References

1956 births
Living people
Athletes (track and field) at the 1984 Summer Olympics
Athletes (track and field) at the 1988 Summer Olympics
Athletes (track and field) at the 1992 Summer Olympics
Athletes (track and field) at the 1996 Summer Olympics
Athletes (track and field) at the 1995 Pan American Games
United States Virgin Islands male long-distance runners
United States Virgin Islands male marathon runners
Olympic track and field athletes of the United States Virgin Islands
Place of birth missing (living people)
Pan American Games competitors for the United States Virgin Islands